"Steelo" is the debut single by American R&B group 702 recorded for the group's debut album No Doubt (1996). The song, which features hip hop artist Missy Elliott, was released as the first single for the album on August 27, 1996.

The song peaked at number 32 on the Billboard Hot 100 chart. By February 1997 it was certified gold in sales by the RIAA, after sales exceeding 500,000 copies in the United States.

The song contains a sample of The Police's "Voices Inside My Head."

An alternate version of this song serves as the intro music for the 1990s Nickelodeon TV show Cousin Skeeter.

Release and commercial performance
The song peaked at thirty-two on the U.S. Billboard Hot 100 and reached the twelfth spot on the Hot R&B/Hip-Hop singles chart. The single was certified gold in February 1997.

Critical reception
Larry Flick from Billboard praised the songs production calling it "infectious". He also felt that lead singer "kameelah Williams shows signs of becoming a major diva over time". Ultimately, he noted that R&B programmers "are already nibbling on this potential smash" and that it will likely draw the attention of "top 40 tastemakers within moments".

Music video

The official music video for the song was directed by Brian Luvar in 1996. Set in Boston, MA, it features choreography heavy group dance scenes, interspersed with community basketball games. Missy Elliott is featured on the song as well as in the video.

Track listing

7", 12"
"Steelo" (Radio Edit) - 3:49 (feat. Missy Elliott)
"Steelo" (LP Version) - 4:17 (feat. Missy Elliott)

7", 12"
"Steelo" (LP Version) - 4:17 (feat. Missy Elliott)
"Steelo" (Radio Edit) - 3:49 (feat. Missy Elliott)
"Steelo" (Instrumental) - 4:17
"Steelo" (A Cappella) - 3:52 (feat. Missy Elliott)

CD Single
"Steelo" (Remix) - 3:33 (feat. Missy Elliott)
"Steelo" (LP Version) - 4:17 (feat. Missy Elliott)

CD Maxi-Single
"Steelo" (Radio Edit) - 3:59 (feat. Missy Elliott)
"Steelo" (Remix) - 3:33 (feat. Missy Elliott and Brad Dacus)
"Steelo" (LP Version) - 4:17 (feat. Missy Elliott)
"Steelo" (Instrumental) - 4:17
"Steelo" (A Cappella) - 3:52 (feat. Missy Elliott)

Charts

Weekly charts

Year-end charts

Personnel
Information taken from Discogs.
production – Chad "Dr. Ceuss" Elliott, George Pearson, Rashad Smith
rapping – Missy Elliott
remixing – Rashad Smith
writing – Chad Elliott, Melissa Elliott, George Pearson, Gordon Sumners

Notes

External links

1996 songs
1996 debut singles
702 (group) songs
Missy Elliott songs
Motown singles
Music videos directed by Brian Luvar
Songs written by Missy Elliott
Songs written by Sting (musician)